Nogometni klub Nafta 1903 or simply NK Nafta 1903 is a Slovenian football club from Lendava which plays in the Slovenian Second League. The club was founded in 2012 and is legally not considered to be the successor of NK Nafta Lendava and the statistics and honours of the two clubs are kept separate by the Football Association of Slovenia.

Honours
Slovenian Cup
 Runners-up: 2019–20

Slovenian Third League
 Winners: 2016–17

Pomurska League (fourth tier)
 Winners: 2012–13

MNZ Lendava Cup
 Winners: 2015–16, 2016–17, 2017–18, 2018–19, 2019–20

Players

Current squad

References

External links
Official website 

Association football clubs established in 2012
Football clubs in Slovenia
2012 establishments in Slovenia